Walter Behrens may refer to:
 Walter Behrens (footballer)
 Walter Behrens (statistician)